Heathfield Community College is a secondary school near the market town of Heathfield, East Sussex, England.

School Enrollment
The college draws its students from a large geographical area. There are currently over 1200 students on roll, with approximately 250 in the Sixth Form.

Founded in 1950, the school was initially envisioned to include an average of 800 students, but now has an average enrollment of 1400 students between the ages of 11 and 18 years old. In 2003 Heathfield Community College was awarded Specialist status in the Visual and Performing Arts, providing funding to be used for arts subjects.

Heathfield Community College is separated into two sections, Secondary School and Sixth Form college.

In 2018, the head teacher Caroline Barlow was criticised by the coastguard and the National Trust for posting a photograph which appeared to show her near the edge of a cliff top at the Birling Gap. As well as closing her Twitter account, she responded by saying that the post was meant light-heartedly, that she was much further away from the edge than she appeared, and that she supported safe behaviour, as well as having learned more about the risks of social media.

Notable former pupils include England rugby player Joe Marler and England badminton player Heather Olver.

References

External links
 

Educational institutions established in 1950
Secondary schools in East Sussex
1950 establishments in England
Community schools in East Sussex